Spitz is a studio album by Spitz, released via Polydor Records in 1991. It is the band's first major-label album. It peaked at number 60 on the Oricon Albums Chart. In 2007, Rolling Stone Japan placed it at number 94 on its list of the "100 Greatest Japanese Rock Albums of All Time".

Track listing

Personnel
Credits adapted from the liner notes.

Spitz
 Masamune Kusano – vocals, acoustic guitar, harmonica
 Tetsuya Miwa – electric guitar, acoustic guitar, electric/acoustic twelve-string guitar, classical guitar
 Akihiro Tamura – four-string bass guitar, eight-string bass guitar
 Tatsuo Sakiyama – drums, tambourine, cabassa, triangle, claves

Additional musicians
 Tsunehiko Yashiro – harmonium ("Bīdama"), ensoliq ("Tsuki ni Kaeru"), Farfisa organ ("Shinigami no Misaki e"), Hammond organ ("Hibari no Kokoro")
 Aska Kaneko – violin ("Umeboshi")
 Jun Takeuchi – violin ("Umeboshi")
 Shigeo Horiuchi – cello ("Umeboshi")
 Shinichi Horiuchi – cello ("Umeboshi")
 Jake H. Conception – bass clarinet ("Umeboshi")

Production
 Spitz – producer, art direction
 Nobuhiko Takahashi – producer
 Juli Kawai – recording engineer, mixing engineer
 Shinya Nakamura – additional engineer
 Jiro Takita – additional engineer
 Koreyuki Tanaka – additional engineer
 Shinji Kobayashi – additional engineer
 Takayoshi Yamauchi – additional engineer
 Reiko Miyoshi – mastering engineer
 Yoshiro Kajitani – art direction, design
 Michiko Arakawa – design
 Masao Torii – photography
 Takeo Ogiso – photography
 Yutaka Yoda – hair, make-up
 Mayumi Katayama – styling
 Yoshitomo Yoshimoto – graphic novel (1997 reissue)
 Stephen Marcussen – remastering engineer (2002 reissue)
 Yoichiro Yamazaki – sleevenotes (2002 reissue)

Charts

Release history

References

External links
 

1991 albums
Spitz (band) albums
Polydor Records albums